In linear algebra and functional analysis, a projection is a linear transformation  from a vector space to itself (an endomorphism) such that . That is, whenever  is applied twice to any vector, it gives the same result as if it were applied once (i.e.  is idempotent). It leaves its image unchanged. This definition of "projection" formalizes and generalizes the idea of graphical projection.  One can also consider the effect of a projection on a geometrical object by examining the effect of the projection on points in the object.

Definitions
A projection on a vector space  is a linear operator  such that .

When  has an inner product and is complete (i.e. when  is a Hilbert space) the concept of orthogonality can be used. A projection  on a Hilbert space  is called an orthogonal projection if it satisfies  for all . A projection on a Hilbert space that is not orthogonal is called an oblique projection.

Projection matrix
 In the finite-dimensional case, a square matrix  is called a projection matrix if it is equal to its square, i.e. if .
 A projection matrix that is not an orthogonal projection matrix is called an oblique projection matrix.
The eigenvalues of a projection matrix must be 0 or 1.

Examples

Orthogonal projection
For example, the function which maps the point  in three-dimensional space  to the point  is an orthogonal projection onto the xy-plane. This function is represented by the matrix

The action of this matrix on an arbitrary vector is

To see that  is indeed a projection, i.e., we compute

Observing that  shows that the projection is an orthogonal projection.

Oblique projection
A simple example of a non-orthogonal (oblique) projection is

Via matrix multiplication, one sees that

showing that  is indeed a projection.

The projection  is orthogonal if and only if  because only then

Properties and classification

Idempotence
By definition, a projection  is idempotent (i.e. ).

Open map
Every projection is an open map, meaning that it maps each open set in the domain to an open set in the subspace topology of the image.

Complementarity of image and kernel
Then  has the following properties:

  is the identity operator  on : 
 We have a direct sum .

Spectrum

Only 0 or 1 can be an eigenvalue of a projection. This implies that an orthogonal projection  is always a positive semi-definite matrix. In general, the corresponding eigenspaces are (respectively) the kernel and range of the projection. Decomposition of a vector space into direct sums is not unique.

If a projection is nontrivial it has minimal polynomial , which factors into distinct linear factors, and thus  is diagonalizable.

Product of projections
The product of projections is not in general a projection, even if they are orthogonal. If two projections commute then their product is a projection, but the converse is false: the product of two non-commuting projections may be a projection. 

If two orthogonal projections commute then their product is an orthogonal projection. If the product of two orthogonal projections is an orthogonal projection, then the two orthogonal projections commute (more generally: two self-adjoint endomorphisms commute if and only if their product is self-adjoint).

Orthogonal projections

When the vector space  has an inner product and is complete (is a Hilbert space) the concept of orthogonality can be used. An orthogonal projection is a projection for which the range  and the null space  are orthogonal subspaces. Equivalently:

A projection is orthogonal if and only if it is self-adjoint.

Properties and special cases
An orthogonal projection is a bounded operator. This is because for every  in the vector space we have, by the Cauchy–Schwarz inequality:

Thus .

Formulas
A simple case occurs when the orthogonal projection is onto a line. If  is a unit vector on the line, then the projection is given by the outer product

(If  is complex-valued, the transpose in the above equation is replaced by a Hermitian transpose). A simple way to see this is to consider an arbitrary vector  as the sum of a component on the line (i.e. the projected vector we seek) and another perpendicular to it, . Applying projection, we get

by the properties of the dot product of parallel and perpendicular vectors.

This formula can be generalized to orthogonal projections on a subspace of arbitrary dimension. Then the projection is given by:

which can be rewritten as

The orthonormality condition can also be dropped.

The matrix  still embeds  into the underlying vector space but is no longer an isometry in general. The matrix  is a "normalizing factor" that recovers the norm.

Then

When the range space of the projection is generated by a frame (i.e. the number of generators is greater than its dimension), the formula for the projection takes the form: . Here  stands for the Moore–Penrose pseudoinverse. This is just one of many ways to construct the projection operator.

All these formulas also hold for complex inner product spaces, provided that the conjugate transpose is used instead of the transpose. Further details on sums of projectors can be found in Banerjee and Roy (2014). Also see Banerjee (2004) for application of sums of projectors in basic spherical trigonometry.

Oblique projections 
The term oblique projections is sometimes used to refer to non-orthogonal projections. These projections are also used to represent spatial figures in two-dimensional drawings (see oblique projection), though not as frequently as orthogonal projections. Whereas calculating the fitted value of an ordinary least squares regression requires an orthogonal projection, calculating the fitted value of an instrumental variables regression requires an oblique projection.

Projections are defined by their null space and the basis vectors used to characterize their range (which is the complement of the null space). When these basis vectors are orthogonal to the null space, then the projection is an orthogonal projection. When these basis vectors are not orthogonal to the null space, the projection is an oblique projection, or just a general projection.

A matrix representation formula for a nonzero projection operator 
Let   be a linear operator  such that  and assume that   is not the zero operator. Let the vectors  form a basis for the range of the projection, and assemble these vectors in the  matrix . The range and the null space are complementary spaces, so the null space has dimension . It follows that the orthogonal complement of the null space has dimension . Let  form a basis for the orthogonal complement of the null space of the projection, and assemble these vectors in the matrix . Then the projection  (with the condition ) is given by

This expression generalizes the formula for orthogonal projections given above. A standard proof of this expression is the following. Put these conditions together, and we find a vector  so that  . So the equation   gives the vector  In this way,  for any vector  and hence .

In the case that  is an orthogonal projection, we can take , and it follows that .  By using this formula, one can easily check that   . In general, if the vector space is over complex number field, one then uses the Hermitian transpose  and has the formula  . Recall that one can define the Moore–Penrose inverse of the matrix  by   since  has full column rank, so  .

Singular values 
Note that  is also an oblique projection. Let 
Denote the singular values of the matrix
 by the positive values .

However, the condition number satisfies the relation , and is therefore not necessarily equal.

Finding projection with an inner product
Let  be a vector space (in this case a plane) spanned by orthogonal vectors . Let  be a vector. One can define a projection of  onto  as

where repeated indices are summed over (Einstein sum notation).

Canonical forms 

Any projection  on a vector space of dimension  over a field is a diagonalizable matrix, since its minimal polynomial divides , which splits into distinct linear factors. Thus there exists a basis in which  has the form

If the vector space is complex and equipped with an inner product, then there is an orthonormal basis in which the matrix of P is

where . The integers  and the real numbers  are uniquely determined.  Note that . The factor  corresponds to the maximal invariant subspace on which  acts as an orthogonal projection (so that P itself is orthogonal if and only if ) and the -blocks correspond to the oblique components.

Projections on normed vector spaces 

When the underlying vector space  is a (not necessarily finite-dimensional) normed vector space, analytic questions, irrelevant in the finite-dimensional case, need to be considered. Assume now  is a Banach space.

Many of the algebraic results discussed above survive the passage to this context. A given direct sum decomposition of  into complementary subspaces still specifies a projection, and vice versa. It is also clear that . , then it is easily verified that . In other words,  is also a projection.

However, in contrast to the finite-dimensional case, projections need not be continuous in general. In other words, the range of a continuous projection  must be a closed subspace. Furthermore, the kernel of a continuous projection (in fact, a continuous linear operator in general) is closed. Thus a continuous projection  gives a decomposition of  into two complementary closed subspaces: .

The converse holds also, with an additional assumption. If there exists a closed subspace  such that , then the projection  with range  and kernel  is continuous. This follows from the closed graph theorem. One needs to show that . Also, . , which proves the claim.

In general, given a closed subspace , there need not exist a complementary closed subspace , although for Hilbert spaces this can always be done by taking the orthogonal complement. For Banach spaces, a one-dimensional subspace always has a closed complementary subspace. This is an immediate consequence of Hahn–Banach theorem. By Hahn–Banach, there exists a bounded linear functional  such that . The operator  satisfies , i.e. it is a projection.

Applications and further considerations 

Projections (orthogonal and otherwise) play a major role in algorithms for certain linear algebra problems:
 QR decomposition (see Householder transformation and Gram–Schmidt decomposition);
 Singular value decomposition
 Reduction to Hessenberg form (the first step in many eigenvalue algorithms)
 Linear regression
 Projective elements of matrix algebras are used in the construction of certain K-groups in Operator K-theory

As stated above, projections are a special case of idempotents. Analytically, orthogonal projections are non-commutative generalizations of characteristic functions. Idempotents are used in classifying, for instance, semisimple algebras, while measure theory begins with considering characteristic functions of measurable sets. Therefore, as one can imagine, projections are very often encountered in the context of operator algebras. In particular, a von Neumann algebra is generated by its complete lattice of projections.

Generalizations 
More generally, given a map between normed vector spaces  one can analogously ask for this map to be an isometry on the orthogonal complement of the kernel: that  be an isometry (compare Partial isometry); in particular it must be onto. The case of an orthogonal projection is when W is a subspace of V. In Riemannian geometry, this is used in the definition of a Riemannian submersion.

See also
Centering matrix, which is an example of a projection matrix.
Dykstra's projection algorithm to compute the projection onto an intersection of sets
Invariant subspace
Least-squares spectral analysis
Orthogonalization
Properties of trace

Notes

References

External links
 , from MIT OpenCourseWare
 , by Pavel Grinfeld.
 Planar Geometric Projections Tutorial – a simple-to-follow tutorial explaining the different types of planar geometric projections.

Functional analysis
Linear algebra
Linear operators